Telegraf may refer to:

 Telegraph
 Telegraf (Baltimore newspaper), an American weekly newspaper
Telegraf (German newspaper), a German daily newspaper
 Telegrafi, a newspaper published in Kosovo
 Dnevni telegraf, a Serbian daily newspaper